Sindorf station is a train station in the town of Sindorf in the German state of North Rhine-Westphalia on the Cologne–Aachen high-speed railway. The station is in the south-east of the Kerpen district of Sindorf and has a side platform on the south side of the S-Bahn line. This is bounded to the south by a noise barrier and the entrances and exits are at the ends of the platform.

History
The original Sindorf station was opened at line-km 22.4 of the Cologne–Aachen railway in 1912 and had a platform north and south of the original line. With the commissioning of the S-Bahn tracks in 2002, the station was relocated to line-km 21.4 and redesignated as a halt. In 2004, citizens complained to the then Minister of Transport Axel Horstmann about the width of the platform. They considered that the three-metre-wide platform was too narrow, which was particularly evident in peak hour traffic. As a result, the ticket machines were relocated. After renewed criticism, the Zweckverband Nahverkehr Rheinland (Rhineland Municipal Transport Association) issued a report in early 2010, in which the maximum capacity of the platform was given as 190 people. However, a maximum of 164 people were recorded in passenger counts in the morning peak hour, which means that the requirements are formally met.

Operations
The station is served by Rhine-Ruhr S-Bahn lines S13 between Sindorf or Düren and Troisdorf and by S19 between Düren and Au (Sieg). Together these provide a service every 20 minutes to Cologne on working days and every 30 minutes on the weekend.

Notes

Railway stations in North Rhine-Westphalia
Rhine-Ruhr S-Bahn stations
S13 (Rhine-Ruhr S-Bahn)
Buildings and structures in Rhein-Erft-Kreis
Railway stations in Germany opened in 2002